Lust Lust Lust is the third studio album by The Raveonettes, released on 12 November 2007 in the UK and on 19 February 2008 in the US, with bonus tracks included. The album was recorded completely by Sharin Foo and Sune Rose Wagner with no studio musicians. The Raveonettes used drum machines instead of real drums, and recorded most bass and non-guitar sounds with keyboards.

The album did not qualify for entry into the UK charts, as both physical formats contained 3D glasses.

Reception

The album received generally positive reviews upon its release. At Metacritic, which assigns a normalised rating out of 100 to reviews from mainstream critics, the album received an average score of 72, based on 29 reviews, which indicates "generally favorable reviews".

Since its release Sune Rose Wagner has stated the album is his favorite Raveonettes' album, stating "I just think [Lust Lust Lust is] our strongest body of work to date. All of the songs are just really good and the sound just sort of melts into each other. It's also super minimal how we recorded it yet so full on at the same time."

Track listing

References

2007 albums
The Raveonettes albums
Fierce Panda Records albums
Vice Records albums